Carex suberecta, known as prairie straw sedge, is a species of sedge native to North America.

References

suberecta
Flora of North America
Taxa named by Stephen Thayer Olney